Clostridium bowmanii  is a psychrophilic, Gram-positive, anaerobic and spore-forming bacterium from the genus Clostridium.

References

 

Bacteria described in 2003
bowmanii